Barbicambarus is a genus of freshwater crayfish found in Tennessee and Kentucky in the United States. It comprises two species:
Barbicambarus cornutus (Faxon, 1884)
Barbicambarus simmonsi Taylor & Schuster, 2010

References

Further reading

Cambaridae
Fauna of the Southeastern United States
Endemic fauna of the United States
Freshwater crustaceans of North America
Crustacean genera
Decapod genera
Taxa named by Horton H. Hobbs Jr.